The Canadian Olympic Hall of Fame is an honour roll of the top Canadian Olympic athletes, teams, coaches, and builders (officials, administrators, and volunteers). It was established in 1949. Selections are made by a committee appointed by the Canadian Olympic Committee. Inductees must have held Canadian citizenship or Canadian residency over the course of their careers.

Inductees by sport 


A

Alpine skiing
 Currie Chapman, coach, 2005
 Betsy Clifford, athlete, 1971
 Laurie Graham, athlete, 2000
 Nancy Greene, athlete, 1971
 Anne Heggtveit, athlete, 1971
 Kathy Kreiner, athlete, 1976
 Kerrin Lee-Gartner, athlete, 1993
 Karen Percy-Lowe, athlete, 1995
 Steve Podborski, athlete, 1985
 Ken Read, athlete, 1984
 Gerry Sorensen, athlete, 1983
 Lucille Wheeler, athlete, 1958
 Rhoda Wurtele, athlete, 1953

Archery
 Lisa Buscombe, athlete, 1985
 Dorothy Lidstone, athlete, 1971
 Lucille Lessard, athlete, 1982
 Don Lovo, builder, 1988
 Joan Frances McDonald, builder, 1992

Artistic gymnastics
 Ernestine Russell, athlete, 1960
 Marilyn Savage, builder, 1982
 Kyle Shewfelt, athlete, 2014
 Willie Weiler, athlete, 1967

Artistic swimming
 Debbie Muir, builder, 1998
 Julie Sauvé, coach, 2012

Athletics
 1996 Men's 4x100 metre Relay Team, athlete/team, 2004
 Bob Adams, builder, 1997
 Lillian Alderson, athlete, 1982
 Syl Apps, athlete, 1975
 Edward Archibald, athlete, 1979
 Donovan Bailey, athlete, 2005
 James Ball, athlete, 1973
 Jane Bell, athlete, 1949
 Calvin Bricker, athlete, 1960
 Debbie Brill, athlete, 1982
 Donald Buddo, builder, 1965
 Ethel Catherwood, athlete, 1949
 Douglas Clement, coach, 2006
 Cyril Coaffee, athlete, 1960
 Myrtle Cook, athlete, 1949
 Gérard Côté, athlete, 1955
 Eric Coy, athlete, 1963
 John Howard Crocker, builder, 1960
 Bill Crothers, athlete, 1965
 John Davies, builder, 1964
 Eva Dawes, athlete, 1974
 Étienne Desmarteau, athlete, 1949
 Phil Edwards, athlete, 1950
 Neil Farrell, builder, 1967
 John Fitzpatrick, athlete, 1975
 Duncan Gillis, athlete, 1979
 George Goulding, athlete, 1949
 F. J. Halbhaus, athlete, 1977
 William Halpenny, athlete, 1979
 Andy Higgins, coach, 2001
 Robina Higgins, athlete, 1961
 Abby Hoffman, athlete/builder, 1996
 Ian Hume, athlete /Builder, 1983
 Lennie Hutton, athlete, 1977
 Harry Jerome, athlete, 1963
 Ben Johnson, athlete, 1988
 Diane Jones-Konihowski, athlete, 1995
 Greg Joy, athlete, 1994
 Joe Keeper, athlete, 1977
 Robert Kerr, athlete, 1949
 Bruce Kidd, athlete, 1966, builder, 1994
 Dallas C Kirkey, builder, 1974
 Walter Knox, builder, 1960
 John Loaring, builder, 1956
 Tom Longboat, athlete, 1960
 Margaret Lord, builder, 1965
 Tom Lord, builder, 1969
 Frank Lukeman, athlete, 1971
 Garfield MacDonald, athlete, 1979
 Nancy McCredie, athlete, 1968
 Mark McKoy, athlete, 1993
 Duncan McNaughton, athlete, 1949
 Aileen Meagher, athlete, 1965
 Alex Oakley, athlete, 1992
 Larry O'Connor, athlete, 1968
 George Orton, athlete, 1996
 Bill Parnell, athlete, 1977
 Marita Payne, athlete, 2001
 Victor Pickard, athlete, 1974
 Paul Poce, builder 2010
 Sam Richardson, athlete, 1977
 Bobbie Rosenfeld, athlete, 1949
 Billy Sherring, athlete, 1949
 Ethel Smith, athlete, 1949
 Dave Steen, athlete, 1977
 Hilda Strike, athlete, 1964
 Bruny Surin, athlete, 2010
 George Sutherland, athlete, 1956
 Betty Taylor, athlete, 1968
 Fred Tees, builder, 1960
 Earl Thomson, athlete, 1949
 Lynn Williams, athlete, 1997
 Percy Williams, athlete, 1949
 Alex Wilson, athlete, 1953
 Harold Webster, athlete, 1955
 James Worrall, builder, 1965

B

Badminton
 Richard Birch, athlete, 1973
 Dorothy M. Forsyth, builder, 1975
 Claire Lovett, athlete, 1972
 Jack Purcell, athlete, 1973
 Marjorie Shedd, athlete, 1976
 Don Smythe, athlete, 1974
 Dorothy Tinline, builder, 1977
 Dorothy Walton, athlete, 1971

Basketball
 Jack Donohue, builder, 1991
 Norman Gloag, builder, 1987
 James Naismith, builder, 1995
 Bob Osborne, builder, 1973
 Andrew Pipe, builder, 1999
 Joyce Slipp, athlete, 1999
 Bev Smith, athlete, 2003
 Sylvia Sweeney, athlete, 1996
 Jay Triano, athlete, 1995

Biathlon
 Myriam Bédard, athlete, 2004
 Ray Kokkonen, builder, 1999
 Patricia Ramage, builder, 1985

Bobsleigh
 Doug Anakin, athlete, 1971
 Douglas Connor, athlete, 1956
 John Emery, athlete, 1971
 Victor Emery, athlete, 1971
 Peter Kirby, athlete, 1971
 David MacEachern, athlete, 2011
 Cliff Powell, builder, 1988
 Robert H. Storey, builder, 1998

Boxing
 Eugene Brousseau, athlete, 1953
 Horace Gwynne, athlete, 1949
 Moe Herscovitch, athlete, 1956
 Lennox Lewis, athlete, 1989
 Tommy Osborne, athlete, 1953
 Bert Schneider, athlete, 1949
 Jerry Shears, builder, 1976
 Dennis White, builder, 1964

Builders (general)
 Henry Brock, builder, 1980
 Leo Burns, builder, 1965
 Norton Crow, builder, 1960
 James Daly, builder, 1994
 George Duthie, builder, 1966
 Mervin E. Ferguson, builder, 1972
 W. E. Findlay, builder, 1960
 Geoff Gowan, builder, 2002
 Nelson C. Hart, builder, 1960
 Frederick C. Henshaw, builder, 1960
 Charles E. Higginbottom, builder, 1966
 George M. Higginbottom, builder, 1960
 J. A. Jackson, builder, 1960
 Frank King, 2008
 Ralph Klein, builder, 2014
 Arthur Lamb, builder, 1960
 Fernand Landry, builder, 1990
 John Leslie, builder, 1960
 Carol Anne Letheren, 2010
 Peter Lougheed, 2010
 George C. Machum, builder, 1960
 Kenneth D. McKenzie, builder, 1976
 James G. B. Merrick, builder, 1960
 Jack Poole, builder, 2019
 John Powell, builder, 1992
 Pat Quinn, builder, 2014
 M. M. (Bobby) Robinson, builder, 1960
 Frank Shaughnessy, builder, 1982
 Walter Sieber, 2010
 George Ritchie Starke, builder, 1960
 Randy Starkman, builder, 2019
 R. Tait McKenzie, builder, 2000
 William J. Warren, 2008
 E. Kenneth Yost, builder, 1963

C

Canadian Olympic Order
 Richard Garneau, journalist, 2014

Canoeing
 Frank Amyot, athlete, 1949
 Doug Bennett, athlete, 2000
 Larry Cain, athlete, 1985
 Frank Clement, builder, 1971
 Renn Crichlow, athlete, 1992
 Hugh Fisher, athlete, 1986
 Alwyn Morris, athlete, 1988
 Frank Garner, builder, 1995
 Sue Holloway, athlete, 1986
 Aubrey Ireland Jr, athlete, 1953
 Ken Lane, athlete, 2003
 Roy Nurse, athlete, 1956
 Bert Oldershaw, athlete/builder, 2004
 E. Howard Radford, builder, 1976
 Robert Sleeth, builder, 1986

Cross-country skiing
 Pierre Harvey, athlete, 2006
 Beckie Scott, athlete, 2012

Curling
 1998 Women's Gold Medal Team Sandra Schmirler Curling Team, athlete/team, 2005

Cycling
 Steve Bauer, athlete, 2005
 Russell Coupland, builder, 1973
 Curt Harnett, athlete, 2006
 Pierre Harvey, athlete, 2006
 Jocelyn Lovell, athlete, 1984

D

Diving
 George Athans, athlete, 1953
 Sylvie Bernier, athlete, 1985
 Beverly Boys, athlete, 1987
 Alexandre Despatie, athlete, 2019
 Donald Dion, coach, 2000
 Eldon C. Godfrey, builder, 2003
 Émilie Heymans, athlete, 2019
 Irene MacDonald, athlete, 1976
 Anne Montminy, athlete, 2005
 Annie Pelletier, athlete, 2003
 Alf Phillips, Sr., athlete, 1976
 Donald Webb, builder, 1993

E

Equestrian
 Jim Day, athlete, 1971
 Jim Elder, athlete, 1971
 Tom Gayford, athlete, 1971
 Gail Greenough, athlete, 1988
 Ian Millar, athlete, 1990

F

Fencing
 John Andru, athlete, 1976
 Percy Erskine Nobbs, builder, 1961
 Carl Schwende, athlete/builder, 1985
 Ernest A. Dalton, builder, 1960

Figure skating
 Norris Bowden, athlete, 1958
 Isabelle Brasseur, athlete, 2001
 Kurt Browning, athlete, 1990
 Petra Burka, athlete, 1972
 Toller Cranston, athlete, 1976
 Frances Dafoe, athlete, 1958
 Lloyd Eisler, athlete, 2001
 Johnny Esaw, builder, 1991
 Donald Jackson, athlete, 1972
 Maria Jelinek, athlete, 1972
 Otto Jelinek, athlete, 1972
 Karen Magnussen, athlete, 1973
 Elizabeth Manley, athlete, 1989
 Paul Martini, athlete, 1985
 Robert McCall, athlete, 1989
 Donald McPherson, athlete, 1972
 Suzanne Morrow, athlete/builder, 1988
 Brian Orser, athlete, 1988
 Robert Paul, athlete, 1958
 David Pelletier, athlete, 2008
 Melville Rogers, builder, 1972
 Louis Rubenstein, builder, 1950
 Jamie Salé, athlete, 2009
 Barbara Ann Scott, athlete, 1949
 Elvis Stojko, athlete, 2011
 Barbara Underhill, athlete, 1985
 Barbara Wagner, athlete, 1958
 Montgomery Wilson, athlete, 2007
 Tracy Wilson, athlete, 1989

Freestyle skiing
 Jean-Luc Brassard, athlete, 2012
 Sarah Burke, builder, 2012
 Lloyd Langlois, athlete, 1987
 Alain LaRoche, athlete, 1987
 Jean-Marc Rozon, athlete, 1998

G

Golf
 George Lyon, athlete, 1971
 Ada Mackenzie, athlete, 1971
 Ross Somerville, athlete, 1975

I

Ice hockey
 1920 Winnipeg Falcons, athlete/team, 2006
 1948 RCAF Flyers, athlete/team, 2008
 1952 Edmonton Mercurys, athlete/team, 2002
 2002 Olympic gold medal men's team, athlete/team, 2009
 2006 Olympic gold medal women's team, athlete/team, 2012
 2010 Olympic gold medal men's team, athlete/team, 2012
 Melody Davidson, coach, 2011
 A. Sidney Dawes, builder, 1976
 Kenneth P. Farmer, builder, 1971
 Randy Gregg, athlete, 1999
 Sydney Halter, builder, 1963
 Jack Hamilton, builder, 1968
 Bob Hindmarch, builder, 2009
 Dave King, builder, 1997
 George Mara, athlete/builder, 1989
 William Northey, builder, 1960
 Claude C. Robinson, builder, 1960
 Danièle Sauvageau, coach, 2008
 Vancouver 2010 Women’s Hockey Team, team, 2019
 Brian Wakelin, builder, 2007

J

Judo
 Frank Hatashita, builder, 1974
 Hiroshi Nakamura, coach, 2019
 Doug Rogers, athlete, 1973
 Shigetaka Sasaki, builder, 1986
 Yoshio Senda, builder, 1977

K

Kayaking
 Caroline Brunet, athlete, 2010

L

Luge
 Douglas Connor, athlete, 1956
 Cliff Powell, builder, 1988

M

Modern pentathlon
 Sandor Kerekes, builder, 1990
 Patricia Ramage, builder, 1985

R

Rhythmic gymnastics
 Lori Fung, athlete, 1985

Rowing
 1984 Men's Eight Rowing Team, athlete/team, 2003
 2008 Men's Eight Rowing Team athlete/team, 2014
 Don Arnold, athlete, 1958
 Darren Barber, athlete, 1994
 Kirsten Barnes, athlete, 1994
 Neil Campbell, builder, 1987
 Shannon Crawford, athlete, 1994
 Andy Crosby, athlete, 1994
 Megan Delehanty, athlete, 1994
 Ignace Walter D'Hont, athlete, 1958
 Ken Drummond, athlete, 1958
 Mike Forgeron, athlete, 1994
 Jack Guest, athlete, 1952
 Thomas Michael Harris, athlete, 1958
 Kathleen Heddle, athlete, 1994
 David Helliwell, athlete, 1958
 George Hungerford, athlete, 1971
 Phillip Keuber, athlete, 1958
 Roger Jackson, athlete, 1971
 Silken Laumann, athlete, 1992
 Lorne Loomer, athlete, 1958
 Thomas Louden, builder, 1960
 Archibald MacKinnon, athlete, 1958
 Robert Marland, athlete, 1994
 Marnie McBean, athlete, 1994
 Richard Neil McClure, athlete, 1958
 Douglas McDonald, athlete, 1958
 Bill McKerlich, athlete, 1958
 Al Morrow, builder, 1994
 Patrick J. Mulqueen, builder, 1960
 Jessica Munroe, athlete, 1994
 Carl Ogawa, athlete, 1958
 Terrence Paul, athlete, 1994
 Bobby Pearce, athlete, 1952
 Derek Porter, athlete, 1994
 Donald Wayne Pretty, athlete, 1958
 Michael Rascher, athlete, 1994
 Frank Read, builder, 1974
 Bruce Robertson, athlete, 1994
 Lou Scholes, athlete, 1952
 Raymond Sierpina, athlete, 1958
 Glen Smith, athlete, 1958
 Tricia Smith, athlete, 2000
 G. Nelles Stacey, builder, 1972
 Brenda Taylor, athlete, 1994
 Lesley Thompson, athlete, 1994
 Arthur Toynbec, athlete, 1958
 John Wallace, athlete, 1994
 Lawrence Kingsley West, athlete, 1958
 Robert Wilson, athlete, 1958
 Kay Worthington, athlete, 1994
 Joseph Wright Jr, athlete, 1952
 Joseph Wright Sr, athlete, 1953
 Herman Zloklikovits, athlete, 1958

S

Sailing
 Caroll-Ann Alie, athlete, 1993
 Evert Bastet, athlete, 1994
 Hans Fogh, athlete, 1986
 Paul Henderson, builder, 2001
 Hank Lammens, athlete, 1993
 Paul McLaughlin, builder, 1977
 Reginald Stevenson, athlete, 1971

Shooting
 Gilmour Boa, athlete, 1955
 Walter Ewing, athlete, 1955
 George Genereux, athlete, 1953
 Susan Nattrass, athlete, 1975
 Gerald Ouellette, athlete, 1957
 John Primrose, athlete, 1975
 Linda Thom, athlete, 1985

Ski jumping
 Horst Bulau, athlete, 1993

Soccer
 Thomas Fried, builder, 2005
 London 2012 Women’s Soccer Team, team, 2019

Speed skating – long track
 Susan Auch, athlete, 2010 (also short track)
 Gordon Audley, athlete, 1998
 Gaetan Boucher, athlete, 1984
 Sylvia Burka, athlete, 1977
 Maurice Gagné, builder, 2006
 Charles Gorman, athlete, 1950
 Jean Gernier, builder, 1995
 Cindy Klassen, athlete, 2014
 Catriona Le May Doan, athlete, 2008
 Cathy Priestner, athlete, 1994
 Jean Wilson, athlete, 1971

Speed skating – short track
 1998 men's short track relay team, athlete/team, 2005
 Sylvie Daigle, athlete, 1991
 Marc Gagnon, athlete, 2007
 Marcel Lacroix, coach, 2014
 Nathalie Lambert, athlete, 1992
 Maryse Perreault, athlete, 1992

Swimming
 Alex Baumann, athlete, 1985
 Munroe Bourne, athlete, 1972
 George Burleigh, athlete, 1976
 Leslie Cliff, athlete, 1997
 Angela Coughlan, athlete, 1977
 Victor Davis, athlete, 1985
 Phyllis Dewar, athlete, 1972
 Howard Firby, coach, 2009
 George Gate, coach, 2002
 Nancy Garapick, athlete, 1993
 Cheryl Gibson, athlete, 2001
 Phyllis Haslam, athlete, 1977
 Paul Hauch, builder, 1975
 George Hodgson, athlete, 1949
 Ralph Hutton, athlete, 1972
 Marianne Limpert, athlete, 2007
 Curtis Myden, athlete, 2011
 Anne Ottenbrite, athlete, 1985
 Bob Pirie, athlete, 1975
 Irene Pirie, athlete, 1977
 Tom Ponting, athlete, 1998
 Dick Pound, athlete/builder, 1975
 Bruce Robertson, athlete, 1973
 Graham Smith, athlete, 2002
 Deryk Snelling, athlete, 2007
 Mary Stewart, athlete, 1975
 Elaine Tanner, athlete, 1971
 Mark Tewksbury, athlete, 1993
 Jeno Tihanyi, coach, 2004
 Beth Whittall, athlete, 1955

Synchronized swimming
 Michelle Cameron, athlete, 1991
 Sylvie Fréchette, athlete, 2006
 Sharon Hambrook, athlete, 1996
 Kelly Kryczka Irwin, athlete, 1996
 Helen Vanderburg, athlete, 1982
 Penny Vilagos & Vicky Vilagos, athletes, 2002
 Carolyn Waldo, athlete, 1987

T

Tennis
 Bob Bedard, athlete, 1973
 Willard Crocker, athlete, 1972
 Bernie Schwengers, athlete, 1973
 Malcolm Laird Watt, builder, 1975
 Robert N. Watt, builder, 1971
 Jack Wright, athlete, 1972

Triathlon
 Les McDonald, builder, 2007
 Simon Whitfield, athlete, 2019

V

Volleyball
 Anton Furlani, builder, 1992
 Garth Pischke, athlete, 1999

W

Water skiing
 George Athans, athlete, 1971
 Caroline Duthie, athlete, 1956
 Joel McClintock, athlete, 1984
 Judy McClintock, athlete, 1987

Weightlifting
 Maurice Allan, builder, 1973
 Christine Girard, athlete, 2019
 Harvey Hill, builder, 1977
 Gerald Gratton, athlete, 1955
 Doug Hepburn, athlete, 1953
 Pierre St. Jean, athlete, 1969

Wrestling
 Egon Beiler, athlete, 1983
 George Denniston, builder, 1976
 Henry Gordon Hudson, athlete, 1960
 Daniel Igali, athlete, 2012
 Danny MacDonald, athlete, 1976
 Earl McCready, athlete, 1961
 Fred Oberlander, builder, 1972
 Vernon Pettigrew, builder, 1973
 Joseph Schleimer, athlete, 1960
 Donald Stockton, athlete, 1953
 Bert Taylor, builder, 1994
 Jim Trifunov, athlete, 1953
 Allan Turnbull, builder, 1987

See also

List of members of Canada's Sports Hall of Fame
Lou Marsh Trophy

References

External links
Canadian Olympic Hall of Fame

Canada at the Olympics
Halls of fame in Canada
All-sports halls of fame
Canadian sports trophies and awards
Awards established in 1949
1949 establishments in Canada
Olympic museums